"On Me" is a song by American rapper Lil Baby, released together with another song, "Errbody", on December 4, 2020, a day after his 26th birthday. The song was produced by Chi Chi and Evrgrn. The official remix of the song with rapper Megan Thee Stallion was released on April 27, 2021.

Background and composition
After a snippet of the song was teased on Instagram, Lil Baby confirmed the release of the song on his birthday. Presumably, the song was dedicated to his girlfriend Jayda Cheaves. Tom Breihan of Stereogum has called the song a "triumphant victory-lap track".

Music video
The music video was released alongside the single. It was directed by Keemotion, and co-directed by Lil Baby. The video shows "expensive rides" with the rapper and his friends; Baby travels with them and is seen on a private jet, jet skiing and cruising on a yacht.

Remix
In March 2021, Lil Baby revealed on social media the possibility of a remix of "On Me" featuring a female artist. On April 27, 2021, the remix was released alongside a music video, as a collaboration with Megan Thee Stallion.

Remix video
Directed by Mike Ho, the music video for the remix features the rappers as "the rulers of a cream kingdom". It opens with Lil Baby in front of an "icy fortress", backdropped by a mountain of ice crystals and falling snowflakes. While he performs his verse, Megan appears beside him lip-syncing. She then raps atop a smoky volcano wearing a black latex bodysuit, which is "fittingly ornamented with lava graphics".

Charts

Original

Weekly charts

Year-end charts

Megan Thee Stallion remix

Certifications

References

2020 singles
2020 songs
Lil Baby songs
Songs written by Lil Baby
Motown singles